Pushpavanam Kuppusamy is a Tamil folk singer, lyricist, writer and music composer of Tamil folk art. He has been credited for reviving the Naatupura Paatu a Tamil folk art. Together with his wife Anitha Kuppusamy, he has conducted several music concerts of Tamil folk songs. Kuppuswamy is also a playback singer. The couple have together brought out several albums of authentic Tamil folk music. He has also written books on Tamil Folk songs. He appears on Television Channels like Sun TV, Vijay TV, and Makkal TV performing musical shows. He is a recipient of the Kalaimamani award from the Government of Tamil Nadu.

Biography 
Kuppusamy studied music at Madras University and gained M.A., M.Phil., Ph.,D.,in music. He received his PhD from Queen Mary's College, Chennai. Sathyabhama University gave Honorary Doctorate to Kuppusamy for his contribution to music.

Along with his wife, he has performed around 3000 shows in India and abroad. He is known for his incorporation of social messages through his music.

Kuppusamy has sung film songs for many popular music directors, including Ilaiyaraaja, Vidyasagar, Yuvan Shankar Raja, Devi Sri Prasad, and G. V. Prakash Kumar.

Kuppusamy is one of the seasonal judges in Vijay TV hosted Airtel Super Singer and Airtel Super Singer Junior.

His songs were simple and intense and brought out the imagery of Tamil culture beautifully in simple words.

Personal life 
Kuppusamy hails from a Tamil family from Nagapattinam district. He is married to Anitha Kuppusamy who is also a singer.

Works

Folk albums 
 Mannu Manakkadhu song
 Mann Vaasam
 Mann Osai
 Karisal Mann
 Solam Vedhaikkayile
 Meham Karukkudhadi
 Kalathu Medu
 Urkkuruvi
 Gramathu Geetham
 Kattumalli
 Adiyathi Dance Dance
 Othaiyadippadhaiyile
 Thanjavooru Manneduthu
 Nattuppura Manam

Devotional albums 
 Anjumalai Azhagan
 Swamiye
 Aatha Vaara
 Kandhan Thiruneeru
 Megam Karukuthadi
 Ayyanin Periya Paathai

Books 
 Makkalisaippadalgal 
 Siruvar Padalgal 
 Pazhamozhikkadhaigal Volume 1 & 2
 Vidukadhaigal
 Kuzhandhaippadalgal Volume 1

Filmography

As Playback singer 
Film songs

Serial songs

As actor

Awards 
 Kalaimamani ( Government of Tamil Nadu)

References 

Tamil folk singers
Tamil playback singers
Tamil-language lyricists
Indian male singer-songwriters
Indian singer-songwriters
Indian male playback singers
20th-century Indian singers
Living people
Tamil singers
Singers from Tamil Nadu
Indian Tamil people
20th-century Indian composers
20th-century Indian male singers
Year of birth missing (living people)